Just Around the Corner is an extant 1921 American silent drama film produced by William Randolph Hearst's Cosmopolitan Productions and distributed through Paramount Pictures. The film is based on a short story, "Superman," by Fannie Hurst and was directed by Frances Marion, a prolific Hollywood scenarist.

The cast are competent silent actors but no big names. Sigrid Holmquist came from Sweden but was no Garbo and Fred Thomson had married Marion in 1919, and later became a big cowboy star. Marion directed one other picture, her friend Mary Pickford's better-known The Love Light (1921).

Plot
As described in a film magazine, ailing Ma Birdsong's (Seddon) well intentioned but misguided daughter Essie (Holmquist)  is wooed by a worthless young man, Joe Ullman (Phillips), who will not visit the home in the ghetto to visit either her mother or brother Jimmie (Sargent), who works to support and protect the family. Essie definitely dismisses him on a night when, unbeknownst to her, her mother is dying, but when she finds out she attempts to recall him so that her mother can believe that she will be well cared for. A passing stranger (Thomson) sympathy is aroused and he agrees to substitute for the trifling Joe. The mother dies peacefully after seeing him, and he eventually comes to love and marry Essie.

Cast
Margaret Seddon as Ma Birdsong
Lewis Sargent as Jimmie Birdsong
Sigrid Holmquist as Essie Birdsong
Eddie Phillips as Joe Ullman (credited as Edward Phillips)
Fred Thomson as The Real Man
Peggy Parr as Lulu Pope
Rosa Rosanova as Mrs. Finshreiber
William Nally as Mr. Blatsky

Preservation status
A copy of Just Around the Corner is in the collection of the Library of Congress.

References

External links

Lantern slide for the film

1921 films
American silent feature films
Films based on short fiction
Paramount Pictures films
American black-and-white films
Silent American drama films
1921 drama films
Films based on works by Fannie Hurst
1920s American films